The Klamath Mountains ecoregion  of Oregon and California lies inland and north of the Coast Range ecoregion, extending from the Umpqua River in the north to the Sacramento Valley in the south. It encompasses the highly dissected ridges, foothills, and valleys of the Klamath and Siskiyou Mountains. It corresponds to the Level III ecoregion designated by the Environmental Protection Agency and to the Klamath-Siskiyou forests ecoregion designated by the World Wide Fund for Nature.

The ecoregion, also known as a geomorphic province, was unglaciated during the Pleistocene epoch, when it served as a refuge for northern plant species. Its mix of granitic, sedimentary, metamorphic, and extrusive rocks contrasts with the predominantly volcanic rocks of the Cascades ecoregion to the northeast. The mild, subhumid climate of the region is characterized by a lengthy summer drought. It supports a mosaic of both northern Californian and Pacific Northwestern conifers and hardwoods.

Ecology 
The ecoregion harbors rich biodiversity, with several distinct plant communities, including temperate rain forests, moist inland forests, oak forests and savannas, high elevation forests, and alpine grasslands. Thirty conifer species inhabit the region, including seven endemic species, making the region one of the richest coniferous forest regions of the world in species diversity. The region also has several edaphic plant communities (adapted to specific soil types), notably those of the region's serpentine outcrops.

Conifer species include Coast Douglas-fir (Pseudotsuga menziesii subsp. menziesii), Lawson's Cypress (also known as Port Orford Cedar, Chamaecyparis lawsoniana), Ponderosa Pine (Pinus ponderosa), Sugar Pine (Pinus lambertiana), Mountain Hemlock (Tsuga mertensiana), White Fir (Abies concolor subsp. lowiana), Red Fir (A. magnifica subsp. shastensis), Weeping Spruce (Picea breweriana), Coast Redwood (Sequoia sempervirens), and Pacific Yew (Taxus brevifolia). These forests mark the northern extent of the range for California Buckeye.

Level IV ecoregions 

The Oregon portion of the ecoregion has been subdivided into seven Level IV ecoregions, as described below.

Rogue/Illinois Valleys (78a) 
The Rogue/Illinois Valleys ecoregion includes terraces and floodplains in the Rogue and Illinois river valleys at an elevation of 900 to 2,000 feet (274 to 610 m). Historically, the valleys supported Oregon white oak and California black oak woodland, with Pacific madrone, ponderosa pine, and grassland. Common understory plants included California fescue, snowberry, and serviceberry. Riparian areas supported willow and cottonwood. Much of the land has been developed for agricultural or residential use, and little of the original vegetation remains. Remnants of oak savanna, prairie vegetation, and seasonal ponds persist on the mesa tops of the Table Rocks north of Medford. Elsewhere, land uses include orchards, cropland, and pastureland. Climate, vegetation, and resulting land use are more similar to Northern California’s inland valleys than to the Willamette Valley ecoregion to the north.

Oak Savanna Foothills (78b) 
The Oak Savanna Foothills ecoregion consists of moderately sloping mountain foothills bordering the Rogue and Illinois river valleys and sharing their Mediterranean climate. Elevation varies from 1,400 to 4,000 feet (427 to 1,219 m). The driest area, east of Medford, is dominated by Oregon white oak and California black oak woodlands, grassland-savanna, ponderosa pine, and Coast Douglas-fir. The wetter foothills flanking the Illinois Valley support Douglas-fir, madrone, and California incense-cedar. Understory species include oceanspray, Western poison-oak, snowberry, Idaho fescue, California brome, roughstalk bluegrass, and ceanothus. The region is lower and less dissected, with more oak woodland and less closed-canopied forest than the Inland Siskiyous.

Umpqua Interior Foothills (78c) 
The Umpqua Interior Foothills ecoregion is a complex of foothills and narrow valleys containing fluvial terraces and
floodplains. Elevation varies from 400 to 2,800 feet (122 to 853 m). It is drier than the foothills of the Willamette Valley, partly because the summer Pacific high pressure system arrives earlier and remains longer than in ecoregions to the north. Summers are hot and dry, and soils have a xeric moisture regime in contrast to the udic soils of the Mid-Coastal Sedimentary ecoregion to the west. The slopes are covered by Oregon white oak woodland, Douglas-fir, grand fir, ponderosa pine, madrone, tanoak, and chinkapin, with an understory chaparral community that includes snowberry, salal, Oregon grape, poison oak, oceanspray, and swordfern. Many areas have been converted to pastureland, vineyards, orchards, and row crops.

Serpentine Siskiyous (78d) 
The Serpentine Siskiyous ecoregion consists of highly dissected mountains containing perennial, high gradient streams at an elevation of 1,500 to 4,300 feet (457 to 1,311 m). It is lithogically distinct from the rest of the Klamath Mountains ecoregion. Many plants have difficulty growing in its serpentine soils due to a shortage of calcium and high levels of magnesium, nickel, and chromium. As a result, vegetation is often sparse and composed of specialist species that have evolved to grow in the potentially toxic and nutrient-poor serpentine soils. It supports a mixed conifer forest of Jeffrey pine, tanoak, incense-cedar, Douglas-fir, and montane chaparral composed of manzanita, ceanothus, Idaho fescue, and Lemmon needlegrass. Historic gold, nickel, chromite, copper, and mercury mining have contributed to water quality problems. Contiguous areas in California have not been mapped yet.

Inland Siskiyous (78e) 

The Inland Siskiyous ecoregion is higher and more mountainous than the neighboring foothill and valley ecoregions, with an elevation of 800 to 7,000 feet (244 to 2,134 m). It has a higher fire frequency, less annual precipitation, and longer summer droughts than the Coastal Siskiyous. Forest cover is a diverse and multi-layered mix of conifers, broadleaf evergreens, and deciduous trees and shrubs, featuring Douglas-fir, ponderosa pine, Oregon white oak, California black oak, madrone, serviceberry, snowberry, Oregon grape, California fescue, and poison oak. Contiguous areas in California have not been mapped yet.

Coastal Siskiyous (78f) 
The Coastal Siskiyous ecoregion consists of highly dissected mountains with a wetter and milder maritime climate than elsewhere in the Klamath Mountains ecoregion. Elevation varies from 600 to 5,300 feet (183 to 1,615 m). Productive forests composed of tanoak, Douglas-fir, bigleaf maple, California laurel, and some Port Orford cedar cover its mountainous landscape, with chinkapin, salal, rhododendron, and swordfern; tanoak is more common than elsewhere in Oregon. Broadleaf evergreens, such as tanoak and madrone, quickly colonize disturbed areas, making it difficult to regenerate conifer forest growth. Xeric soils derived from Siskiyou rock types are characteristic; udic soils which support western hemlock and Sitka spruce are present but are less common than in the wetter Coast Range ecoregion to the west. Contiguous areas in California have not been mapped yet.

Klamath River Ridges (78g) 
The Klamath River Ridges is characterized by highly dissected mountains, with a dry, continental climate. Elevation varies from 3,800 to 7,500 feet (1,158 to 2,286 m). Vegetation varies with slope, aspect, and elevation. Higher altitudes and north-facing slopes have Douglas-fir and white fir; lower elevations and south-facing slopes are covered in ponderosa pine and western juniper, species that are more drought-resistant than other vegetation types found within the region. The chaparral features Oregon grape, western fescue, snowberry, bluebunch wheatgrass, and ceanothus. Contiguous areas in California have not been mapped yet.

See also 
 Ecoregions defined by the Environmental Protection Agency and the Commission for Environmental Cooperation:
 List of ecoregions in North America (CEC)
 List of ecoregions in the United States (EPA)
 List of ecoregions in Oregon
 List of ecoregions in California
 The conservation group World Wildlife Fund maintains an alternate classification system:
 List of ecoregions (WWF)
 List of ecoregions in the United States (WWF)

References

External links 

A Celebration of the Conifer Diversity in Northwest California
Conifers of Northwest California
Klamath-Siskiyou Forests images at bioimages.vanderbilt.edu (slow modem version)
CNPS: Rare and Endemic Conifers of Northwest California

Eco 1
 01
K 01
Ecoregions of California
Ecoregions of Oregon
Pacific temperate rainforests